Good Hope is an unincorporated community in Neshoba County, Mississippi, United States.

References

Unincorporated communities in Neshoba County, Mississippi
Unincorporated communities in Mississippi